Padunna Puzha (The Singing River) is a 1968 Indian Malayalam-language film, directed by M. Krishnan Nair and produced by T. E. Vasudevan. The film stars Prem Nazir, Sheela, Jayabharathi and Adoor Bhasi. The film had musical score by V. Dakshinamoorthy. The film was remade in Tamil as Mannippu (1969).

Plot

Cast 

Prem Nazir
Sheela
Jayabharathi
Adoor Bhasi
Sankaradi
T. R. Omana
Aranmula Ponnamma
G. K. Pillai
K. P. Ummer
Panjabi
Prathapan
Thodupuzha Radhakrishnan
Ushanandini

Soundtrack 
The music was composed by V. Dakshinamoorthy with lyrics by Sreekumaran Thampi.

References

External links 
 

1960s Malayalam-language films
1968 films
Films directed by M. Krishnan Nair
Malayalam films remade in other languages